The 1974 ICF Canoe Sprint World Championships were held in Mexico City, Mexico in neighboring Xochimilco. This marked the first time the championships took place outside Europe. , all championships have taken place either in Europe or North America. The lake was where the canoeing and rowing events took place for the 1968 Summer Olympics.

The men's competition consisted of six Canadian (single paddle, open boat) and nine kayak events. Three events were held for the women, all in kayak.

This was the eleventh championships in canoe sprint.

Medal summary

Men's

Canoe

Kayak

Women's

Kayak

Medals table

References
ICF medalists for Olympic and World Championships - Part 1: flatwater (now sprint): 1936-2007.
ICF medalists for Olympic and World Championships - Part 2: rest of flatwater (now sprint) and remaining canoeing disciplines: 1936-2007.

Icf Canoe Sprint World Championships, 1974
C
ICF Canoe Sprint World Championships
C
Canoeing and kayaking competitions in Mexico